Lucila Garfias Gutiérrez (born 1 December 1951) is a Mexican politician affiliated with the PANAL. She currently serves as Deputy of the LXII Legislature of the Mexican Congress representing the Mexico State.

References

1951 births
Living people
Politicians from the State of Mexico
Women members of the Chamber of Deputies (Mexico)
Members of the Chamber of Deputies (Mexico)
New Alliance Party (Mexico) politicians
21st-century Mexican politicians
21st-century Mexican women politicians
Members of the Congress of the State of Mexico
Deputies of the LXII Legislature of Mexico